Benibo Frederick Anabraba is a politician in Rivers State, Nigeria. He is the Member of the Rivers State House of Assembly
for Akuku-Toru II and current
Minority Leader of the Rivers State House of Assembly. He was first elected to the House of Assembly in the 2011 general election as a member of the People's Democratic Party. He later switched allegiance to the All Progressives Congress in an act of loyalty to Governor Chibuike Amaechi.

References

Living people
Members of the Rivers State House of Assembly
People from Akuku-Toru
Rivers State Peoples Democratic Party politicians
All Progressives Congress politicians
Year of birth missing (living people)